Theodora Komnene or Comnena may refer to:
 Theodora Komnene (daughter of Alexios I) (born 1096), daughter of Alexios I Komnenos, wife of Constantine Angelos and ancestor of the Angelos dynasty
 Theodora Komnene Dalassene, sister of Alexios I Komnenos, wife of Constantine Diogenes II
 Theodora Komnene, Queen of Jerusalem (born c. 1145), niece of Manuel I Komnenos, wife of Baldwin III of Jerusalem
 Theodora Komnene, Duchess of Austria (died 1184), niece of Manuel I Komnenos, wife of Henry II, Duke of Austria
 Theodora Komnene, Princess of Antioch (fl. 1140), niece of Manuel I Komnenos, wife of Bohemond III of Antioch